Badula platyphylla is a species of plant in the family Primulaceae. It is endemic to Mauritius.  Its natural habitat is subtropical or tropical dry forests.

References

platyphylla
Critically endangered plants
Endemic flora of Mauritius
Taxonomy articles created by Polbot